John Moriarty (2 February 1938 – 1 June 2007) was an Irish writer and philosopher.

A native of County Kerry, he was educated in Listowel and at University College Dublin. In 1974, he moved to England from Canada where he had taught English literature at the University of Manitoba, and subsequently became a live-in gardener in the Carmelite monastery at Boars Hill, Oxford.

Moriarty subsequently lived at the foot of Mangerton Mountain in County Kerry until his death.

A film "inspired by the works" of Moriarty, Dreamtime, Revisited, was directed by Dónal Ó Céilleachair and Julius Ziz and released in October 2012.

Books
Dreamtime (Dublin, The Lilliput Press, 1994 - revised 1999)
Turtle Was Gone a Long Time: Crossing the Kedron (The Lilliput Press, 1996)
Horsehead Nebula Neighing (The Lilliput Press, 1997)
Anaconda Canoe (The Lilliput Press 1999)
Nostos (autobiography) (The Lilliput Press 2001)
Invoking Ireland: Ailiu Iath n-hErend (The Lilliput Press, 2005)
Slí na Fírinne (Slí na Fírinne Publishing, 2006)
Night Journey to Buddh Gaia (The Lilliput Press, 2006)
Serious Sounds (The Lilliput Press, 2007)
What the curlew said. Nostos continued (autobiography) (The Lilliput Press, 2007)
One Evening in Eden (The Lilliput Press, 2007) - a CD box set containing a collection of stories narrated by Moriarty

Interviews
A series of interviews of Moriarty, by Joe Duffy on the RTÉ radio show Liveline, are available as an iTunes podcast.

References

External links
 The greatest Irish thinker you’ve never read? It could be this man - The Irish Times, 13 June 2019.
 John Moriarty Institute for Ecology and Spirituality
 "Kerry poet and philosopher John Moriarty dies, aged 69"  - IrelandOn-Line
 Obituary of John Moriarty written in 'The Guardian' newspaper, by Peter Clare (30 August 2007)

1938 births
2007 deaths
Alumni of University College Dublin
Irish scholars and academics
Irish expatriates in Canada
Irish expatriates in the United Kingdom
Irish gardeners
Irish writers
People from Listowel
Roman Catholic writers
Academic staff of the University of Manitoba
20th-century Irish philosophers